The 2017–18 PBA season was the 43rd season of the Philippine Basketball Association. The league continued to use the three-conference format, starting with the Philippine Cup. The Commissioner's Cup and the Governors' Cup were the second and third conferences in the upcoming season.

The first event of the season was the 2017 PBA draft, held on October 29.

Executive board
 Andres Y. Narvasa, Jr. (Commissioner until December 31, 2017)
 Willie Marcial (officer-in-charge starting January 1, 2018, appointed commissioner on January 25, 2018) 
 Victorico P. Vargas (Chairman, representing TNT KaTropa)
 Richard Bachmann (Vice-Chairman, representing Alaska Aces)
 Raymond Zorilla (Treasurer, representing Phoenix Fuel Masters)

Teams

Arenas
Like several Metro Manila-centric leagues, most games are held at arenas within Metro Manila, either the Smart Araneta Coliseum or the Mall of Asia Arena, and sometimes, in the Ynares Center in Antipolo. Games outside this area are called "out-of-town" games, and are usually played on Saturdays. Provincial arenas usually host one game, rarely two; these arenas typically host only once per season, but a league may return within a season if the turnout is satisfactory.

Typically, all playoff games are held in Metro Manila arenas, although playoff and Finals games have been seldom played in the provinces.

Main arenas

Out-of-town arenas

Highlighted are playoff games.

Transactions

Retirement
October 30, 2017: Jayjay Helterbrand officially announced his retirement after playing 17 seasons in the PBA, all of them with the Barangay Ginebra San Miguel franchise.

Coaching changes

Rule changes
The PBA competition committee approved the rule changes for implementation starting in the Commissioner's Cup games:

Notable events

Pre-season
November 2, 2017: The majority of the PBA Board of Governors passed a resolution stating that they will no longer support or endorse the renewal of Commissioner Chito Narvasa's tenure due to "loss of confidence". Representatives from Alaska, Blackwater, Meralco, NLEX, Rain or Shine, Phoenix and TNT attended a special board meeting on November 2 that passed this resolution. Deputy Commissioner and Technical Head Rickie Santos will be the league's officer-in-charge while the board will still tackle who will replace Narvasa as commissioner. Later in the afternoon, the bloc that composes the three San Miguel Corporation (SMC) teams (San Miguel, Barangay Ginebra and Star) as well as independent teams GlobalPort and Kia stated their continued support with Narvasa. Former PBA chairman Robert Non criticized the move done by the seven board members for making a "whimsical" decision in ousting Narvasa and mentioned that the move was unauthorized and non binding as per the league's by-laws. According to the PBA by-laws, a two-thirds vote of its current membership is necessary to remove or appoint a commissioner. Non also criticized the timing of the meeting when the meeting notice was only sent to all board representatives on Monday, October 30. According to the rules, the board representatives should have been notified seven days before the date set for the meeting. Narvasa later called a press conference at the PBA office in Libis and indicated that he will not resign as the commissioner. He is also requesting the seven teams that will not endorse his term renewal to explain the grounds of their "loss of confidence" to the current commissioner. He also stated that he is willing to resign the commissioner post, but after consultation with his family and lawyers, he will hold on as commissioner, given that any move to oust him should follow the rules stated in the league's by-laws.
November 27, 2017: The Star Hotshots changed their name to Magnolia Hotshots. The team's new logo debuted during the team's press launching.
December 11, 2017: The NLEX Road Warriors adopted a new logo. The new logo debuted during the team's press launching.
December 17, 2017: PBA Commissioner Chito Narvasa officially tendered his resignation. The board of governors have advised Narvasa to stay as commissioner until December 31, 2017 to have a smooth transition to his eventual successor. The board also named Media Bureau chief Willie Marcial as the league's officer-in-charge.

Philippine Cup
Mark Caguioa changed his jersey number from #47 to #13 to honor his recently retired teammate Jayjay Helterbrand. He will use the #13 jersey for the duration of the Philippine Cup.
January 25, 2018: The PBA Board of Governors official appointed officer-in-charge Willie Marcial as the tenth commissioner of the league.
March 27, 2018: The lifetime ban on Renaldo Balkman was lifted. The lifetime ban was imposed by former commissioner Chito Salud on March 13, 2013 due to an incident involving his former teammate Arwind Santos when Balkman grabbed Santos by the neck in the final minutes of their game against Alaska on March 8, 2013. Before lifting the ban, Commissioner Willie Marcial consulted Santos and former commissioner Salud and gave their approval.

Commissioner's Cup
April 3, 2018: The Kia Picanto changed their name to Columbian Dyip. The team's new logo and uniforms will debut at the opening day of the Commissioner's Cup on April 22.

Governors' Cup
August 10, 2018: The GlobalPort Batang Pier changed their name to NorthPort Batang Pier. The team's new logo debuted through their social media accounts.
September 9, 2018: The Meralco Bolts will represent the Philippines in the 2018 FIBA Asia Champions Cup. This development came after FIBA Secretary-General Patrick Baumann requested the Samahang Basketbol ng Pilipinas to have a PBA team participate in the club championship.
November 11, 2018: Former PBA commissioner and Board of Governors chairman Rey Marquez died.
Major adjustments in the league calendar, particularly in the upcoming season were made during the league's annual board planning session in Las Vegas, Nevada, United States, primarily because of FIBA calendar changes. The start of the PBA's 44th season will be set on January 13. This will be the first time since 2002 that the league will open their season in January. The PBA Leo Awards will be held during the opening ceremonies of the 2019 season while the 2018 PBA draft is set on December 16.
Starting the 2019 draft, trading the rights for the draft's number one pick will be banned.
The term of Ricky Vargas as PBA chairman will be extended up to the 2019 season.

Opening ceremonies
The opening ceremonies for this season was held at the Smart Araneta Coliseum in Quezon City on December 17, 2017. The first game of the Philippine Cup between the Phoenix Fuel Masters and the San Miguel Beermen immediately followed.

The muses for the participating teams are as follows:

2017–18 PBA Philippine Cup

Elimination round

Playoffs

Quarterfinals 

|}

|}
*Team has twice-to-beat advantage. Team #1 only has to win once, while Team #2 has to win twice.

Semifinals 

|}

Finals 

|}

 Finals MVP: June Mar Fajardo 
 Best Player of the Conference: June Mar Fajardo

2018 PBA Commissioner's Cup

Elimination round

Playoffs

Quarterfinals 

|}

|}
*Team has twice-to-beat advantage. Team #1 only has to win once, while Team #2 has to win twice.

Semifinals 

|}

Finals 

|}

 Finals MVP: Scottie Thompson 
Best Player of the Conference: June Mar Fajardo 
Bobby Parks Best Import of the Conference: Justin Brownlee

2018 PBA Governors' Cup

Elimination round

Playoffs

Quarterfinals 

|}
*Team has twice-to-beat advantage. Team #1 only has to win once, while Team #2 has to win twice.

Semifinals 

|}

Finals 

|}
Finals MVP: Mark Barroca 
Best Player of the Conference: Paul Lee 
Bobby Parks Best Import of the Conference: Mike Harris

Awards

Leo Awards

 Most Valuable Player: June Mar Fajardo (San Miguel)
 Rookie of the Year: Jason Perkins (Phoenix)
 Most Improved Player: Scottie Thompson (Barangay Ginebra)
 First Mythical Team:
 Paul Lee (Magnolia)
 Stanley Pringle (NorthPort)
 Marcio Lassiter (San Miguel)
 Japeth Aguilar (Barangay Ginebra)
 June Mar Fajardo (San Miguel)
 Second Mythical Team:
 Scottie Thompson (Barangay Ginebra)
 Mark Barroca (Magnolia)
 Matthew Wright (Phoenix)
 Arwind Santos (San Miguel)
 JP Erram (Blackwater)
 All-Defensive Team:
 Chris Ross (San Miguel)
 Rome dela Rosa (Alaska)
 Gabe Norwood (Rain or Shine)
 Rafi Reavis (Magnolia)
 June Mar Fajardo (San Miguel)
 Samboy Lim Sportsmanship Award: Gabe Norwood (Rain or Shine)

PBA Press Corps Annual Awards
 Defensive Player of the Year: JP Erram (Blackwater)
 Scoring Champion: Stanley Pringle (NorthPort)
 Baby Dalupan Coach of the Year: Chito Victolero (Magnolia)
 Mr. Quality Minutes: Vic Manuel (Alaska)
 Breakout Player of the Year: Chris Tiu (Rain or Shine)
 Danny Floro Executive of the Year:  Alfrancis Chua (Barangay Ginebra San Miguel)
 Order of Merit
 June Mar Fajardo (San Miguel)
 Paul Lee (Magnolia)
 Vic Manuel (Alaska)
All-Rookie Team
 Paul Zamar (Blackwater)
 Robbie Herndon (Magnolia)
 Jeron Teng (Alaska)
 Jason Perkins (Phoenix)
 Christian Standhardinger (San Miguel)
All-Interview Team
 Yeng Guiao (NLEX)
 Joe Devance (Barangay Ginebra)
 Chris Ross (San Miguel)
 Mike DiGregorio (Blackwater)
 Christian Standhardinger (San Miguel)
 Chris Tiu (Rain or Shine)
 Game of the Season: Barangay Ginebra vs. Rain or Shine (March 3, 2018, Philippine Cup eliminations)
 President's Cup: PBA Board
 PBA Press Corps Lifetime Achievement Award: Wilfred Uytengsu (team owner of Alaska)

Statistics

Individual statistical leaders

Local players

Import players

Individual game highs

Local players

Import players

Team statistical leaders

PBA teams in Asian club competitions

Cumulative standings

Elimination round

Playoffs

References

External links
 PBA Official Website

 
PBA